DEP or Dep may refer to:

Arts, entertainment, and media
 Dep (magazine), a publication of Vietnam News Agency
 DeP (musician), American singer, actor and model
 DEP International, a defunct British record label founded by the band UB40
 Dillinger Escape Plan, a heavy metal band

Organizations
 Delayed Entry Program, a United States Armed Forces recruit program
 Democracy Party (Turkey), pro-Kurdish political party in Turkey
 Department of Environmental Protection (disambiguation), a common government agency

Places
 Dep (city), Ancient Egyptian city that merged into Buto
 Dep (river), a river in Amur Oblast, Russia
 Dep, Iran
 Deptford railway station, London, England, National Rail station code

Science and technology
 Data Execution Prevention, a security feature in computer operating systems
 Dielectrophoresis, the force  exerted on a dielectric particle subjected to a non-uniform electric field
 Diethyl phthalate, an organic compound
 Diethylphosphite, an organophosphorus compound

Other uses 

 Dépanneur, Quebec English term for a convenience store
 Dependency (disambiguation), including dependent and depend